Wetschen is a municipality in the district of Diepholz, in Lower Saxony, Germany.

See also 
 Rehden Geest Moor, a local nature reserve

References

Diepholz (district)